Qeshlaq-e Mirza Ali (also Romanized as Qeshlāq-e Mīrzā ‘Alī and Qeshlāq-e Mīrzā‘alī) is a village in Bakeshluchay Rural District, in the Central District of Urmia County, West Azerbaijan Province, Iran. At the 2006 census, its population was 112, in 32 families.

References 

Populated places in Urmia County